The Vancouver Warriors are a lacrosse team based in Vancouver, British Columbia. The team plays in the National Lacrosse League (NLL). The 2019 season is the 20th in franchise history and the 6th season in Vancouver. The franchise previously played in Everett, Washington, San Jose, and Albany, New York. They were the Vancouver Stealth but changed their team name during the off season  to the Vancouver Warriors for 2019 season.

Regular season

Final standings

Game log

Roster

References

Vancouver
Vancouver Warriors seasons